Josinaldo Lima dos Santos (born May 25, 1985), known as Josinaldo Branco or Branco, is a Brazilian footballer who plays as forward for Nacional–AM. He already played for national competitions such as Copa do Brasil, Campeonato Brasileiro Série D and Campeonato Brasileiro Série C.

Career statistics

References

External links

1985 births
Living people
Brazilian footballers
Association football forwards
Campeonato Brasileiro Série C players
Campeonato Brasileiro Série D players
Águia de Marabá Futebol Clube players
Nacional Futebol Clube players
People from Boa Vista, Roraima
Sportspeople from Roraima